Giuseppe Lagrotteria (born 11 February 1959) is an Italian weightlifter. He competed in the men's light heavyweight event at the 1984 Summer Olympics.

References

External links
 

1959 births
Living people
Italian male weightlifters
Olympic weightlifters of Italy
Weightlifters at the 1984 Summer Olympics
Sportspeople from the Province of Vibo Valentia
20th-century Italian people